The La Puerta Formation is a Late Jurassic to Early Cretaceous geologic formation of southern Bolivia. The fluvial and eolian sandstones preserve ichnofossils of Theropoda indet., Thyreophora indet., Ankylosauria indet. and Stegosauria indet. at the Tunasniyoj tracksite. The formation is possibly a distal extension of the Botucatu Formation. The Tunasniyoj assemblage is the oldest dinosaur tracksite for Bolivia, and includes the oldest known evidence assigned to ankylosaurs and stegosaurs for South America.

See also 
 List of fossiliferous stratigraphic units in Bolivia
 List of stratigraphic units with dinosaur tracks
 List of stratigraphic units with theropod tracks
 Chaunaca Formation
 Toro Toro Formation

References

Bibliography 
 

Geologic formations of Bolivia
Lower Cretaceous Series of South America
Jurassic System of South America
Late Jurassic South America
Cretaceous Bolivia
Jurassic Bolivia
Sandstone formations
Aeolian deposits
Fluvial deposits
Ichnofossiliferous formations
Paleontology in Bolivia
Formations